The Bhumibol Adulyadej-class frigate is a class of frigates operated by the Royal Thai Navy. The design is a variant of the Republic of Korea Navy's  design, with additional stealth features. This is the first ship in the High-Performance Frigate Boat Project of the Royal Thai Navy. It is able to perform 3D combat operations on surface, underwater and air.

The lead ship of the class, named HTMS Bhumibol Adulyadej, was constructed in South Korea. It was commissioned on 7 January 2019, with the original name as HTMS Tha Chin. It was subsequently renamed HTMS Bhumibol Adulyadej.

Ships in class

See also
 List of naval ship classes in service
 List of equipment of the Royal Thai Navy

References 

Ships of the Royal Thai Navy
Frigate classes